DCH may refer to:

 Development Construction Holding, an investment company from Kharkiv, Ukraine
 Dah Chong Hong, a Chinese machine-building corporation
 Doctor of Clinical Hypnotherapy, a doctorate diploma
 Dil Chahta Hai, Hindi movie released in 2001
 Declarative Componentized Hardware, a type of device driver for Universal Windows Platform-based versions of Windows 10

See also